PVSRIPO, or PVS-RIPO, is the name of a modified polio virus that has recently shown promise for treating cancer. It is the focus of clinical trials being conducted at Duke University.

PVS-RIPO consists of a genetically modified nonpathogenic version of the oral poliovirus Sabin type 1. The internal ribosome entry site (IRES) on the poliovirus was replaced with the IRES from human rhinovirus type 2 (HRV2), to avoid neurovirulence. Once administered, the virus enters and begins replicating within cells that express CD155/Necl5, which is an onco-fetal cell adhesion molecule that is common across solid tumors.

A website at Duke University describes many of properties of PVSRIPO, and historical background about using viruses to oppose cancer. According to that website,

The potential value of PVSRIPO was the focus of a 2015 story on 60 Minutes.

In May 2016, the US Food and Drug Administration granted it breakthrough therapy designation for glioblastoma.

See also
 Oncolytic virus

References

Enteroviruses
Experimental cancer treatments
Virotherapy
Biotechnology
Emerging technologies
Experimental drugs
Infraspecific virus taxa